Ryan Petrik (born 4 March 1981) is an Australian basketball coach who currently serves as head coach of the Perth Lynx of the Women's National Basketball League (WNBL). He started his coaching career as an assistant coach with the Rockingham Flames Men's SBL team before being elevated to the head coaching role of the Flames Women's SBL team, where over 10 seasons he guided them to three grand finals and two championships while earning WSBL Coach of the Year honours. Between 2015 and 2020, he served as an assistant coach with the Lynx, and between 2019 and 2022, he served as head coach of the Flames men's team. In 2022, he was named the WNBL Coach of the Year and guided the Flames men to the NBL1 West championship and NBL1 National championship.

Coaching career

Rockingham Flames
In December 2008, Petrik was appointed head coach of the Rockingham Flames Women's SBL team for the 2009 season after spending the previous four years as an assistant coach with the Men's SBL team. As a rookie, he led the team to one of their best ever performances with a third-place finish and a 15–7 record with no imports and just one national league player. He subsequently re-signed with the Flames, and in 2010, the team had their best ever regular season as they finished in second place with a 16–6 record. After back-to-back quarter-final losses as the higher seed, the Flames went on to have their worst ever season in 2011 as they finished last with a 2–20 record.

In 2012, Petrik guided the Flames back into the finals with a fourth-place finish and a 15–7 record. They went on to win through to the WSBL Grand Final to become the first Rockingham team (men or women) to reach a grand final. In the championship decider, the Flames were outclassed by the South West Slammers, losing 85–48. For the season, Petrik was named the WSBL Coach of the Year. In 2013, he guided the Flames to a semi-final appearance behind a second-place 16–6 regular season.

In 2014, the Flames collected the club's first ever minor premiership with a first-place finish and a 20–2 record. They went on to reach the WSBL Grand Final after going undefeated over the first two rounds of the finals. In the championship decider, Petrik's one-two punch of Sami Whitcomb and Darcee Garbin saw them beat the Lakeside Lightning 80–75 to claim their maiden WSBL championship. In 2015, the Flames finished as minor premiers for the second straight year, once again with a 20–2 record. They made their way through to their third WSBL Grand Final in four years after going undefeated over the first two rounds of the finals. Behind a 41-point effort from Whitcomb, the Flames claimed back-to-back titles with a 68–63 win over the Willetton Tigers.

In 2016, Petrik guided the Flames to a semi-final appearance behind a second-place 18–4 regular season. This was followed by a 2017 season that saw the Flames miss the finals with an 11th-place finish and a 6–16 record. Petrik's final season in charge of the Flames' women's team came in 2018, as they finished third with a 16–6 record before losing in the quarter-finals.

In October 2018, Petrik was appointed head coach of the Flames Men's SBL team for the 2019 season. In his first season with the men's team, he led them to a fourth-place 18–8 regular season and a quarter-final appearance. He returned as men's coach in 2020 for the West Coast Classic.

In November 2020, Petrik signed a three-year deal with the Flames to remain as men's head coach until the end of the 2023 NBL1 West season. In 2021, he guided the Flames men to their first ever grand final, where they lost 92–82 to the Perry Lakes Hawks.

In 2022, Petrik guided the Flames men to their second straight grand final appearance, and the team's first ever championship, defeating the Geraldton Buccaneers 91–79. At the NBL1 National Finals, the team was crowned national champions with an 85–74 win over the Frankston Blues in the championship game.

Perth Lynx
In June 2015, Petrik was appointed an assistant coach to the Perth Lynx of the Women's National Basketball League (WNBL).

In June 2020, after five seasons as an assistant under Andy Stewart, Petrik was appointed head coach of the Lynx on a two-year deal. His debut season as coach was in the WNBL's Hub season in Queensland due to the COVID-19 pandemic. The Lynx finished the season in seventh place with a 4–9 record.

In the 2021–22 season, Petrik was named the WNBL Coach of the Year after guiding the Lynx to second place with an 11–5 record. They went on to reach the WNBL Grand Final.

On 30 May 2022, Petrik re-signed as coach of the Lynx on a multi-year contract.

Personal life
Petrik's father was president of Rockingham Basketball during the 1990s.

In 2019, Petrik married Women's SBL player Chelsea Armstrong. The couple had their first child in April 2021.

References

External links

Old Rockingham Flames coaching profile

1981 births
Living people
Australian men's basketball coaches
Australian women's basketball coaches
Perth Lynx coaches